Kunzea ciliata is a flowering plant in the myrtle family, Myrtaceae and is endemic to the south-west of Western Australia.

Description
The flowers are pink or pale pink and arranged in rounded clusters of twelve to eighteen mostly near the ends of longer branches which continue to grow after flowering. Flowering occurs in October and November but sometimes in other months when conditions are favourable. The fruit that follows flowering is an urn-shaped capsule with the remains of the sepals attached.

Taxonomy and naming
Kunzea capitata was first formally described in 1996 by Hellmut Toelken and the description was published in Journal of the Adelaide Botanic Garden. The specific epithet (ciliata) is derived from the Latin word cilium meaning "eyelash", referring to the hairy bracts.

Distribution and habitat
Often found on or among granite slopes and gneiss outcrops in coastal areas, K. ciliata occurs between Cape Naturaliste and Cape Leeuwin where it grows in loamy sand soils.

Conservation
Kunzea ciliata is listed as "not threatened" by the Government of Western Australia Department of Parks and Wildlife.

References

ciliata
Endemic flora of Western Australia
Myrtales of Australia
Rosids of Western Australia
Plants described in 1996
Taxa named by Hellmut R. Toelken